Facklamia sourekii is a Gram-positive and facultatively anaerobic  bacteria from the family of Facklamia which has been isolated from humans.

References

External links
Type strain of Facklamia sourekii at BacDive -  the Bacterial Diversity Metadatabase

Further reading 
 

Bacteria described in 1999
Lactobacillales